Weavers Needle is a  column of rock that forms a distinctive peak visible for many miles around. It is set in a desert landscape of cactus and mesquite bush, with large Saguaro cacti particularly prominent. The peak was named after mountain man Pauline Weaver.

Weavers Needle has played a significant role in the stories of the Lost Dutchman's Gold Mine. The Needle's shadow reportedly indicates the location of a rich vein of gold, and many treasure hunters have searched for it. The hunt for gold around Weavers Needle has been pursued by hundreds (possibly thousands) of people. Weavers Needle has a large split in the side that makes it look like it has two tops, not one. This can only be viewed from the side.

Weavers Needle can be climbed as a four-pitch route. Each of the pitches is rated a 5.0 or less, with the second pitch being more of a class 4 scramble. The route is trad, and opportunities for protection with traditional gear are ample. No permit is required to hike to Weavers Needle, or to climb, or to camp at the top. Highly experienced climbers will often free-solo, and rappel from the fixed anchors at the top. Despite the relatively low rating of the climb, this is not recommended for beginner or intermediate climbers.

The area surrounding Weavers Needle was burned in the Sawtooth Fire in June 2020.

See also
 Tonto National Forest

References

External links
 Weavers Needle. GemLand.

Superstition Mountains
Landforms of Pinal County, Arizona
Tonto National Forest
Mountains of Arizona
Mountains of Pinal County, Arizona